Bowling Green Township is an inactive township in Pettis County, in the U.S. state of Missouri.

Bowling Green Township takes its name from Bowling Green, Kentucky, the native home of a first settler.

References

Townships in Missouri
Townships in Pettis County, Missouri